Gary Crossan (born 20 October 1971) is a long-distance runner. He was born in Letterkenny, County Donegal, Ireland. He was educated at St Eunan's College, Letterkenny and finished college running career at Florida Southern College. He is also a member of the Letterkenny Athletic Club. Irish olympian Eoin Rheinisch is his cousin.

Achievements
Crossan has been Irish National Marathon Champion for four consecutive years. In 2002 he was the top Irish finisher at the 2002 Dublin Marathon clocking up a time of 2:20:16 and the National Marathon Champion in Belfast with a time of 2:24:20. He was the top Irish finisher at the 2003 Dublin Marathon, finishing 6th overall in a time of 2:20:27 , and continued his championship tally with times of 2:24:07 in 2004 and 2:23:19 in 2005 . He has also been Irish National Half-Marathon Champion. He won the Newry Marathon in 2008. Gary Crossan won the Gael Force North challenge on 4 June 2011.

References

1971 births
Living people
Irish male long-distance runners
People educated at St Eunan's College
People from Letterkenny
Sportspeople from County Donegal
Irish male marathon runners